"Le cose che non mi aspetto" (English: The things that I don't expect) is a song recorded by Italian singer Laura Pausini and produced by Paolo Carta, released in May 2012 as the fifth single from Pausini's 2011 studio album Inedito. The lyrics of the song were written by Laura Pausini and Niccolò Agliardi, while the music was composed by Niccolò Agliardi and Luca Chiaravalli.

The song was also recorded in a Spanish-language version, adapted by Ignacio Ballesteros and titled "Las cosas que no me espero". This version of the song was included in the Hispanic edition of the album, Inédito. "Las cosas que no me espero" was later re-recorded as a duet with Venezuelan singer Carlos Baute for the 2012 special edition of the album. The duet is set to be released in Spain on 30 October 2012.

Both versions of the song were performed during the Inedito World Tour, but as of March 18, 2012, the song was removed from the setlist. Starting to the Summer leg of the Inedito World Tour the song was reintroduced.

Following the release of the DVD Inedito Special Edition on November 27, 2012, Le cose che non mi aspetto was re-released as a single in Europe and Brazil, with Celeste being released in Italy and the duet version of Las cosas que no me espero in the Americas and Spain.

According to Nielsen Music, "Le cose che non mi aspetto" was the 35th most aired song in Italy during 2012.

Lyrics
According to Pausini, the song is a "thank you" to all her fans around the world, who always give her the support she needs to continue

Music video

The music video for "Le cose che non mi aspetto" was filmed in Berlin on 9 May 2012 by debuting Italian director Salvatore Billeci, a student at the Accademia di Belle Arti in Viterbo.

Billeci commented on the video claiming that he proposed Pausini to adopt "a style with moving graffiti, using the recurrent word 'Grazie' [Italian for 'Thank you'] in several languages, in order to highlight the love and gratitude Laura really feels for all the fans following her all over the world".

The last part of the videoclip shows the word "Casa" (Italian for home) on a wall, with symbols from all the countries Pausini has visited in her career, including the Eiffel Tower in Paris and Christ the Redeemer statue in Rio de Janeiro.

The videoclip was presented for the first time on May 26, 2012 at the Arena di Verona during the Wind Music Awards 2012 award giving and was made disponible on June 13, 2012 on the official site of the newspaper Corriere della Sera and on June 18, 2012 on all musical channels.

Track listing
 Digital download – Italian version 
"Le cose che non mi aspetto" – 3:45
 Digital download – Spanish version
"Las cosas que no me espero" (feat. Carlos Baute) – 3:44

Charts

Personnel

Music credits
 Niccolò Agliardi – composer
 Emiliano Bassi – drums, percussions
 Matteo Bassi – bass
 Paolo Carta – guitar, computer programming
 Luca Chiaravalli – backing vocals, additional computer programming, composer
 Gianluigi Fazio – backing
 Laura Pausini – vocals, backing vocals, composer
 Bruno Zucchetti – piano, hammond, keyboards, computer programming

Production credits
 Renato Cantele – engineer
 Paolo Carta – producer, arranger, engineer
 Luca Chiaravalli – pre-production
 Nicola Fantozzi – assistant
 Fabrizio Pausini – studio manager
 Laura Pausini – producer

Release history

References

Laura Pausini songs
Atlantic Records singles
Italian-language songs
Spanish-language songs
2012 singles
Songs written by Niccolò Agliardi
Songs written by Laura Pausini
2011 songs